Robert Oberton Spicer (April 11, 1925 – February 27, 2016) was an American professional baseball player. A right-handed pitcher and occasional outfielder, he had a highly successful 15-season minor league career (1947–1961) but played only four games as a relief pitcher in Major League Baseball for the – Kansas City Athletics.

Spicer's career began in the Chicago Cubs' farm system with 16, 21 and 20-victory seasons from 1947–1949 in levels ranging from Class D (the lowest rung then on the minor league ladder) to Class AA. In 1949 he helped lead the Macon Peaches to the Class A Sally League championship, tying for the league lead in wins with 20, and was selected to the all-star team. He spent four full seasons with the Los Angeles Angels of the top-level Pacific Coast League before the Athletics, newly transplanted from Philadelphia, selected him in the 1954 Rule 5 draft. He was part of the first Major League team to represent Kansas City.

In his first game, April 17, 1955, at Briggs Stadium, he entered the game in the fifth inning with the Detroit Tigers already leading the Athletics, 6–0. Spicer surrendered one run in the fifth, but was unable to record an out in the sixth frame, giving up a leadoff home run to Al Kaline, a future Hall of Famer, and leaving the bases loaded. All would score in an eventual 16–0 Tiger win.  Spicer appeared in one more game for Kansas City that season, on April 23 at home against the Chicago White Sox at Municipal Stadium. Again he was treated roughly, surrendering two more home runs (to Minnie Miñoso and Jack Harshman) and five more earned runs in  innings in a 29–6 rout. It was his last MLB appearance of 1955.

After a successful 1956 campaign with the Triple-A Columbus Jets, Spicer returned to the Athletics for a second trial after the rosters expanded in September. In his first outing, September 18, he pitched a scoreless third of an inning in a 6–5 triumph over the Boston Red Sox in Kansas City.  Four days later, however, in what would be his final MLB game, facing the White Sox at Comiskey Park, Spicer was roughed up again for five earned runs in another one-sided Chicago win, 17–3. All told, he gave up 15 hits and 15 earned runs in five innings of work, with two strikeouts and five bases on balls.

Spicer resumed his minor league career in 1957, eventually winning 166 games through 1961. A good-hitting pitcher, he spent some time in the outfield between pitching assignments, and batted .244 lifetime.

References

External links

Obituary

1925 births
2016 deaths
Asheville Tourists players
Baseball players from Richmond, Virginia
Chattanooga Lookouts players
Columbus Jets players
Des Moines Demons players
Fayetteville Cubs players
Kansas City Athletics players
Little Rock Travelers players
Los Angeles Angels (minor league) players
Lumberton Cubs players
Macon Peaches players
Major League Baseball pitchers
Nashville Vols players
Savannah A's players
Shreveport Sports players
Springfield Cubs (Massachusetts) players
Williamsport Grays players